The men's normal hill individual competition of the Beijing 2022 Olympics was held on 5–6 February, at the Snow Ruyi hill in Zhangjiakou. The event was won by Ryōyū Kobayashi of Japan became the Olympic champion. Manuel Fettner of Austria won the silver medal, and Dawid Kubacki of Poland the bronze medal. For Kobayashi and Fettner this was the first ever Olympic medal, and for Kubacki the first individual Olympic medal.

Summary
The 2018 champion, Andreas Wellinger, did not qualify for the Olympics. The silver medalist, Johann André Forfang, and the bronze medalist, Robert Johansson, qualified, but Forfang did not participate in this event. Piotr Żyła is the 2021 World champion. Karl Geiger and Anže Lanišek are the silver and bronze medalists, respectively. Geiger was leading the 2021–22 FIS Ski Jumping World Cup at the start of the Olympics, followed by Ryōyū Kobayashi, Halvor Egner Granerud, and Marius Lindvik.

Kobayashi won the first spring, six points ahead of Peter Prevc. Kamil Stoch, the 2014 champion, was in the third position. In the second jump, Dawid Kubacki, wo was eight in the first round, jumped at 103 m and took the lead. Manuel Fettner, who was fifth, jumped at 104 m, and took the lead as well. Evgenii Klimov, Stoch, and Prevc all demonstrated jumps insufficient for a medal, but Kobayashi with a 99.5 m jump won gold. Kobayashi became the first Japanese athlete to win the ski jumping event after the 1998 games in Nagano, Japan, and second Japanese athlete to win the individual normal hill event after Yukio Kasaya in 1972. This was also the first time that a Japanese athlete won a gold medal in a ski jumping event outside of Japan.

Schedule

Official training

Qualifying

Competition

Qualification

Results

Qualifying
50 ski jumpers qualified for the finals.

Final
The final was held on 6 February at 19:00.

References

Ski jumping at the 2022 Winter Olympics
Men's events at the 2022 Winter Olympics